This is an alphabetical list of Argentine classical composers.

 Antonio Agri (1932–1998)
 Amancio Jacinto Alcorta (1805–1862)
 Eduardo Alonso-Crespo (born 1956)
 Rodolfo Arízaga (1926–1985)
 Hector Ayala (1914–1990)
 Luis Bacalov (born 1933)
 Esteban Benzecry (born 1970)
 Felipe Boero (1884–1958)
 José Antonio Bottiroli (1920–1990)
 José Bragato (born 1915)
 Carlos López Buchardo (1881–1948)
 Facundo Cabral (1937-2011)
 Sergio Calligaris (born 1941)
 Julio de Caro (1899–1980)
 Fernando González Casellas (1925–1998)
 Graciela Castillo (born 1940)
 Juan José Castro (1895–1968)
 Alejandro Civilotti (born 1959)
 Ellen C. Covito (born 1974)
 Mario Davidovsky (born 1934)
 Hilda Dianda (born 1925)
 Daniel Doura (born 1957)
 Oscar Edelstein (born 1953)
 Juan Pedro Esnaola (1808–1878)
 Juan Falú (born 1948)
 Juan de Dios Filiberto (1885–1964)
 Roberto Firpo (1884–1969)
 Carlos Gardel (1890–1935)
 Alberto Ginastera (1916–1983)
 Osvaldo Golijov (born 1960)
 Carlos Guastavino (1912–2000)
 Emilio Kauderer (born 1950)
 Mauricio Kagel (1931–2008)
 Marcelo Koc (1918–2006)
 Maria Teresa Luengo (born 1940)
 Enrique Maciel (1897–1962)
 Claudio Maldonado (born 1980)
 Rosita Melo (1897–1981)
 Rosendo Mendizabal (1868–1913)
 Silvina Milstein (born 1956)
 Ricardo Montaner (born 1957)
 Jorge Morel (born 1931)
 Mariano Mores (1918-2016)
 Nelly Moretto (1925–1978)
 Ettore Panizza (1875–1967)
 Graciela Paraskevaidis (born 1940)
 Marcela Pavia (born 1957)
 Juan Carlos Paz (1901–1972)
 Polo Piatti (1954-)
 Astor Piazzolla (1921–1992)
 Osvaldo Pugliese (1905–1995)
 Máximo Diego Pujol (born 1957)
 Ariel Ramírez (1921–2010)
 Waldo de los Ríos (1934–1977)
 Zenón Rolón (1856–1902)
 Enrique Saborido (1877–1941)
 Juan María Solare (born 1966)
 Atilio Stampone (1926-2022)
 Alicia Terzian (born 1934)
 Juan Carlos Tolosa (born 1966)
 Terig Tucci (1897–1973)
 Irma Urteaga (born 1929)
 Alberto Williams (1862–1952)

Classical Composers
Lists of composers by nationality

Classical Composers